Ertan Demiri (born 24 January 1979) is a retired Macedonian footballer. He belongs to the ethnic Albanian minority in the country.

Club career

Childhood and early career
Ertan Demiri was born in Saraj, Skopje, Socialist Federal Republic of Yugoslavia to Albanian Parents. Growing up in Saraj, Demiri enrolled into FK Sloga Jugomagnat, the football club based in Čair.

Career in Macedonia
Demiri stayed in Sloga Jugomagnat for five years, earning 78 appearances and scoring three times. during his stay, Demiri helped Sloga win the Macedonian First league. After his successful stint, Demiri left and joined Skopje's other club, FK Vardar.

While at Vardar, Demiri made 42 appearances and scored twice. At the end of the 2007 season, Demiri moved to crosstown rivals, FK Rabotnički.

Demiri stayed at Rabotnički for one season. He made 26 appearances and helped the team win both the Macedonian Cup and the Macedonian First league. Demiri was also a crucial member of the squad and made a significant impact on the team during the qualification period of the UEFA cup. He scored a goal against ND Gorica in the second leg of the pairing and an assist against HŠK Zrinjski Mostar. Demiri had a strong influence on match against English Premier league side, Bolton Wanderers F.C. Demiri's aggressive approach in defence and his pinpoint passing helped Rabotnički score against Bolton on the counter.   
After his season at FK Rabotnički, Demiri moved abroad to K.S.C. Lokeren

Lokeren
Demiri did not adjust well from the transition from the Macedonian league and the Belgian league, and did not gell into the team well. He made nine appearances and left the club in 2010 after one and a half years at the club.

Return to Macedonia
After making brief stints at Al Taawon and KS Bylis Ballsh, Demiri returned to the Macedonian league, joining FK Teteks.

Shkëndija
During the winter break of the 2011/2012 season, Demiri moved to crosstown rivals FK Shkëndija

FK Partizani Tirana

Demiri signed a two-year contract with Partizani Tirana during summer 2013. He made his debut with a goal against Kastrioti Krujë on 31 August 2013.

On 12 October 2013, in the first Tirana derby since 2009, Demiri scored the winner in the 57th minute after a mistake from the young goalkeeper Marsel Çaka.

International career
Demiri has made one appearance for the Macedonian national team against Moldova in a February 2009 international friendly.

Demiri was an unused substitute for the Republic of Macedonia national football team in a 2010 FIFA World Cup qualifying match against Scotland on 6 September 2008.

Honours

Club
Sloga Jugomagnat
Macedonian First League: 2001

Rabotnički
Macedonian First League: 2008
Macedonian Cup: 2008

References

External links
 Profile at MacedonianFootball 
 

1979 births
Living people
Footballers from Skopje
Albanian footballers from North Macedonia
Association football midfielders
Macedonian footballers
North Macedonia international footballers
FK Sloga Jugomagnat players
FK Vardar players
FK Rabotnički players
K.S.C. Lokeren Oost-Vlaanderen players
FK Metalurg Skopje players
Al-Taawoun FC players
FK Teteks players
KF Shkëndija players
FK Partizani Tirana players
Macedonian First Football League players
Belgian Pro League players
Saudi Professional League players
Kategoria Superiore players
Macedonian expatriate footballers
Expatriate footballers in Belgium
Macedonian expatriate sportspeople in Belgium
Expatriate footballers in Saudi Arabia
Macedonian expatriate sportspeople in Saudi Arabia
Expatriate footballers in Albania
Macedonian expatriate sportspeople in Albania